The Singapore Medical Journal is a monthly peer-reviewed general medical journal. It was established in 1960 and is published by Medknow Publications on behalf of the Singapore Medical Association. The editor-in-chief is Poh Kian Keong. According to the Journal Citation Reports, the journal has a 2021 impact factor of 3.331.

References

External links

Publications established in 1960
General medical journals
English-language journals
Monthly journals
Medknow Publications academic journals